Obadiah Titus (January 20, 1789 – September 2, 1854) was a U.S. Representative from New York.

Biography
Born in what is now Millbrook, Dutchess County, New York, Titus was educated locally and studied law.  He was admitted to the bar and commenced practice in the town of Washington, New York.  He was also active in farming, and served as Secretary of the Dutchess County Agricultural Society.  In addition, Titus was an organizer of the Dutchess County Mutual Insurance Company.

He was active in the New York Militia, and was appointed an ensign in Lieutenant Colonel Benjamin Herrick's Regiment of Light Infantry.  During the War of 1812 he was a captain in New York's 141st Infantry Regiment.

Titus served in local offices, including county judge.  He served as Sheriff of Dutchess County, New York from 1828 to 1831.

Titus was elected as a Democrat to the Twenty-fifth Congress (March 4, 1837 – March 3, 1839).  He was an unsuccessful candidate for reelection in 1838 to the Twenty-sixth Congress.  He resumed the practice of law, and was also active in business, including serving as a Vice President of the New York and Albany Railroad.

He died in the town of Washington on September 2, 1854.  He was interred in Nine Partners (Friends) Burial Ground in Millbrook.

References 

1789 births
1854 deaths
American militia officers
American militiamen in the War of 1812
Democratic Party members of the United States House of Representatives from New York (state)
Sheriffs of Dutchess County, New York
New York (state) state court judges
New York (state) lawyers
Burials in New York (state)
19th-century American politicians
19th-century American judges
19th-century American lawyers